The Sabail FK 2019–20 season was Sabail's third Azerbaijan Premier League season, and their fourth season in existence. After finishing the previous season in third place, Sabail qualified for the UEFA Europa League for the first time, entering at the first qualifying round stage with a tie against CS Universitatea Craiova. Sabail will also take part in the Azerbaijan Premier League and in the Azerbaijan Cup.

Season events
On 13 March 2020, the Azerbaijan Premier League was postponed due to the COVID-19 pandemic.

On 19 June 2020, the AFFA announced that the 2019–20 season had been officially ended without the resumption of the remains matches due to the escalating situation of the COVID-19 pandemic in Azerbaijan.

Squad

Transfers

In

Loans in

Out

Trial

Released

Friendlies

Competitions

Overview

Premier League

Results summary

Results by round

Results

League table

Azerbaijan Cup

UEFA Europa League

Qualifying rounds

Squad statistics

Appearances and goals

|-
|colspan="14"|Players away from Sabail on loan:
|-
|colspan="14"|Players who left Sabail during the season:

|}

Goal scorers

Clean sheets

Disciplinary record

References

Azerbaijani football clubs 2019–20 season
Sabail